Bodonal de la Sierra is a municipality located in the province of Badajoz, Extremadura, Spain.

References

Municipalities in the Province of Badajoz